Ľuboš Blaha (born 7 December 1979) is a Slovak politician and political scientist. He is a member of the National Council of the Slovak Republic and a presidium member of the national-populist party Direction – Slovak Social Democracy.

From 2004 to 2006, Blaha worked for the Communist Party of Slovakia as the Head of its International Department.
Despite calling him to give up on his tenure, Blaha works as a political scientist at the Institute of Political Sciences at the Slovak Academy of Sciences.

Blaha's political positions have been described as populist, protectionist, and left-wing nationalist.

Political activities 
Blaha has been a member of the National Council of the Slovak Republic since 2012. He used to support modern Western Marxism, radical democratic movements, and culturally liberal positions. He argues that in the era of neoliberal globalization, the Left must be more focused on socio-economic (redistribution of wealth, cooperative ownership, economic democracy) rather than cultural issues and that the social conservatism of working class in Slovakia must be accommodated.

Politically, Blaha champions Old Left but is also fond of more authoritarian regimes, including Chavez's Venezuela, Castro's Cuba and Morales's Bolivia. He has praised particularly the high progressive taxes and workers' project funds. In Slovakia, he promotes the cooperative business model such as the Spanish-Basque Mondragón Cooperative Corporation.

Ľuboš Blaha is a foreign policy realist. His opinions are inspired by the school of international political realism (e.g. the ideas of Kenneth Waltz and John Mearsheimer) and neo-Marxism (especially William Robinson, Immanuel Wallerstein and Antonio Negri). He strongly criticizes U.S. foreign policy. He vehemently condemned not only the war in Iraq, but also the war in Afghanistan. He also criticized the Western involvement in Libya and Syria. He is a critic of the foreign policy of Israel in relation to Palestine. He advocates for the rights of Armenians in relation to the Nagorno-Karabakh and criticizes Turkish foreign policy. He endorses many of the ideas of Noam Chomsky and Slavoj Zizek.

He is one of the greatest defenders of the Russian Federation in Slovakia since the Russo-Ukrainian War broke out. He does not see himself as an apologist for Vladimir Putin's regime, but he perceives the crisis in Ukraine as a geopolitical clash between the West and Russia, and he rejects what he considers one-sided criticism of Russia and the growing Russophobia in Europe. He has openly criticized the Sanctions against Russia and he describes Russia as a friendly nation that liberated Slovakia from fascism in 1945.

Blaha is very critical of the European Union. He considers the EU a neoliberal and elitist project, but he does not see a better alternative for Slovakia than the EU. He supports the fight for a different, better, and more social Europe that will be more left-wing and democratic. In the past, he advocated the project of European basic income, he consistently promotes social economy and cooperatives, and strongly advocates for a "Social Union".

He is a sharp critic of the TTIP agreement in Slovakia. He was the first Slovak Member of Parliament to visit the so-called "TTIP Reading Room". He describes the agreement as synonymous with neo-liberalism and the colonization of the European social model by American transnational corporations, and as the Chairman of the National Council of the Slovak Republic for European Affairs he actively supports its intense scrutiny.

During the Greek crisis in 2015, he openly supported Syriza and defended the arguments of Alexis Tsipras and Yanis Varoufakis. After the breaking-up of Syriza and the agreement between Greece and its creditors, he further criticizes the EU for the imposition of a "neo-liberal diktat". He remains a supporter of Syriza.

Blaha opposed mandatory quota proposals during migration crisis. His arguments were based on human rights (not forcing refugees to be settled in countries in which they do not want to live), on tactical thinking (Central European societies are not ready for shock solutions, they need time and sensitive approach), and on political realism (mandatory quotas in these societies, he claimed, would only favor fascists and the political far-right). He has criticized "bleeding-heart liberals" for their supposed contempt for the people who are afraid of uncontrolled migration, calling them "racists" and "xenophobes". However, he strongly refuses and condemns islamophobia and advocates for the solidarity of Slovakia with the EU, be it material, financial or personal.

He is the author of the Declaration of the National Council of the Slovak Republic, in which all Slovak parliamentary groups declared their opposition to the quotas and emphasized other forms of solidarity, systemic solutions and the fight against right-wing extremists taking advantage of the migration crisis.

In the 2016 election campaign, he expressed disenchantment with the EU and stressed the four issues which he sees as the main failures of Europe: Greece, Russia, TTIP and the migration crisis. There were other main themes of his election campaign in addition to the criticism of the European Union – resistance to capitalism and exploitation; resistance to Western imperialism and propaganda; fight for peace. Blaha espouses socialism, anti-capitalism, alter-globalism and moderate pacifism. Thus, he is marked as a "Russian agent" by critics.

Parliamentary activity 
As an MP, Ľuboš Blaha has participated in only three legislative proposals:

The first legislative initiative of MP Blaha was in 2017, when he and 7 other MPs proposed an amendment to part of the Labour code.

In 2018, along with five other MPs from Direction – Slovak Social Democracy, he co-signed the proposal concerning free lunches in public schools.

In 2020, MPs Blaha, Fico, and Kamenický submitted an amendment to the law on public holidays, adding one line that 30 September would be the Day of the Munich Betrayal.

Criticism and controversies 
International Press Institute, along with the Slovak Academy of Sciences, condemned his abusive series of Facebook posts targeting two female Slovak journalists in 2019. Slovak Academy of Sciences and Academy of the Police Force condemned his posts on social media which go against the ethical code of the institutions. Security company ESET sued Blaha to protect its reputation. Court ordered Blaha to erase false posts about ESET. He called a special prosecutor a "young snot" (while falsely claiming the prosecutor was only 25 years old).

In July 2020, Blaha was investigated by the Slovak Police under the law that prohibits denying or approving genocide or crimes against humanity. Blaha had posted on Facebook about "lies about murderous communists and innocent victims", claiming that the Communist regime had eliminated gangsters and helped ordinary people. The investigation and the charges were dropped in September 2020.

He has been repeatedly criticized for spreading hoaxes, conspiracy theories and disinformation through Facebook posts in which he attacks President Zuzana Čaputová, government politicians, several media outlets, the third sector, the Slovak Republic's foreign policy, the vaccination against COVID-19, and spreads pro-Russian disinformation narratives. 

In February 2022, the Slovak Academy of Sciences called Blaha to give up on his tenure immediately. However, Blaha refused to resign by saying the Slovak Academy of Sciences could burn him to death, imprison and persecute him, but he will not give up his freedom of speech.

Blaha was banned from Facebook for spreading misinformation about the COVID-19 pandemic on June 14th 2022.

Books 
 Blaha, Ľuboš. Social Justice and Identity. Bratislava: Veda, 2006. 164 p. .
 Blaha, Ľuboš. Back to Marx? (A Welfare State, Economic Democracy and Theories of Justice). Bratislava: Veda, 2009. 526 p. .
 Blaha, Ľuboš.The Matrix of Capitalism – An Approaching Revolution? Bratislava: Veda, 2011. 176 p. .
 Blaha, Ľuboš. The European Social Model – What's Next? Bratislava: Veda, 2014. 480 p. .

References

External links 
 Ľuboš Blaha's blog
 Ľuboš Blaha's profile at the Slovak Academy of Sciences
 "Fico ist der am weitesten links stehende Premier Europas" (Interview with Luboš Blaha), in: junge Welt, 12 June 2010. English Version here.

1979 births
Living people
Direction – Social Democracy politicians
COVID-19 conspiracy theorists
Members of the National Council (Slovakia) 2012-2016
Members of the National Council (Slovakia) 2016-2020
Members of the National Council (Slovakia) 2020-present
Matej Bel University alumni
Comenius University alumni
21st-century Slovak politicians